Jean Cusson (born October 5, 1942) is a Canadian retired professional ice hockey player who briefly played in the National Hockey League for the Oakland Seals. Cusson spent three years with the Canadian national team before the Seals signed him to a three-game amateur tryout contract in March, 1968. He only played two games for the Seals registering no points and a single shot on goal. He returned to Canada and played 2 seasons as a senior amateur, then moved to Switzerland and played out the remainder of his career in the National League A, serving as a player-coach until retiring in 1979 to focus on coaching, which he did until 1983. Cusson also excelled in other sports such as Canadian football and was drafted by the Montreal Alouettes in the 9th round of the 1964 CFL Draft

Career statistics

Regular season and playoffs

International

External links
 
 1970 interview (in french) of Jean Cusson in Geneva upon his arrival in Switzerland

1942 births
Living people
Canadian expatriate ice hockey players in Switzerland
Canadian ice hockey coaches
Canadian ice hockey left wingers
Genève-Servette HC players
HC La Chaux-de-Fonds players
Oakland Seals players
People from Verdun, Quebec
SCL Tigers players
Ice hockey people from Montreal
Université de Montréal alumni